Rub-a-Dub-Tub  was a children's television series broadcast in the United Kingdom on the breakfast television channel TV-am between 1983 and 1984.

In addition to the main regular presenters, the programme also featured appearances by some of the presenting team from the main TV-am programme, including Anne Diamond; Nick Owen and Lizzie Webb.

Programmes

Teddy Drop Ear
Yakari

References

External links 

1983 British television series debuts
1984 British television series endings
British children's television series
Breakfast television in the United Kingdom
1980s British children's television series
English-language television shows
TV-am original programming